Mikheil Dzhishkariani (born 1 November 1969) is a Georgian former professional footballer who played as a forward.

Club career
Dzhishkariani played mostly in Georgia and Russia, except for a spell at FC Dynamo Kyiv in 1993–1995 and a spell in Germany with Wormatia Worms. In Russia he played for FC KAMAZ Naberezhnye Chelny, FC Torpedo-ZiL Moskva, FC Sokol-Saratov, FC Krasnoznamensk and FC Neftyanik Ufa.

International career
He played for the Georgian national team in 1992 and 1994, and was capped 2 times.

References

External links

1969 births
Living people
Sportspeople from Sukhumi
Footballers from Abkhazia
Soviet footballers
Footballers from Georgia (country)
Association football forwards
Georgia (country) international footballers
Expatriate footballers from Georgia (country)
Expatriate footballers in Germany
Expatriate footballers in Russia
Expatriate footballers in Ukraine
FC Dinamo Tbilisi players
FC Dynamo Kyiv players
FC Arsenal Kyiv players
FC KAMAZ Naberezhnye Chelny players
Russian Premier League players
FC Moscow players
FC Sokol Saratov players
FC Neftyanik Ufa players
FC Dinamo Batumi players
Ukrainian Premier League players
Expatriate sportspeople from Georgia (country) in Germany
Expatriate sportspeople from Georgia (country) in Russia
Expatriate sportspeople from Georgia (country) in Ukraine